Statistics of Soviet Top League for the 1978 season.

Overview
It was contested by 16 teams, and Dinamo Tbilisi won the championship.

Introduction of draw limit, a number of games tied during a season.

League standings

Results

Top scorers
19 goals
 Georgi Yartsev (Spartak Moscow)

15 goals
 Ramaz Shengelia (Dinamo Tbilisi)

13 goals
 Oleg Blokhin (Dynamo Kyiv)

11 goals
 Nikolai Latysh (Shakhtar)

10 goals
 Vladimir Klementyev (Zenit)

9 goals
 Nikolai Kolesov (Dynamo Moscow)

8 goals
 Aleksei Belenkov (CSKA Moscow)
 Vakhtang Koridze (Dinamo Tbilisi)
 Viktor Kuznetsov (Zorya Voroshylovhrad)

7 goals
 Konstantin Bakanov (Pakhtakor)
 Anatoliy Banishevskiy (Neftchi)
 Yuri Chesnokov (CSKA Moscow)
 Vladimir Fyodorov (Pakhtakor)
 Yevgeni Khrabrostin (Torpedo Moscow)
 David Kipiani (Dinamo Tbilisi)
 Aleksandr Maksimenkov (Dynamo Moscow)
 Vladimir Onischenko (Dynamo Kyiv)
 Vladimir Ploskina (Chornomorets)
 Andrei Redkous (Zenit)
 Yuri Reznik (Shakhtar)
 Vitaliy Shevchenko (Chornomorets)
 Vitali Starukhin (Shakhtar)

References
Soviet Union - List of final tables (RSSSF)

1969
1
Soviet
Soviet